Judith Stolzer-Segall (1904–1990) was a German Jewish modern architect. She is believed to be the first female architect to ever design and build a synagogue.

Life 
Judith Stolzer-Segall was born in the Russian Empire on May 20, 1904. She grew up in Berlin following the expulsion of Jews from Lithuania in 1914.

In 1924, Stolzer-Segall matriculated at the Technische Hochschule Danzig where she studied architecture until 1929. Following her graduation, she was employed at various offices, eventually going on to found her own office in 1932.

In 1933, Stolzer-Segall immigrated to Mandatory Palestine. In Palestine, she worked with a number of other Jewish architects including Oskar Kaufmann and Eugen Stolzer. During this period, Stolzer-Segall won the commission for the design of the Central Synagogue of Hadera; the building is believed to be the first synagogue designed by a woman.

Stolzer-Segall returned to Germany in 1957, going on to become a citizen of the country in 1968.

Judith Stolzer-Segall died on January 12, 1990, in Munich, Germany.

Work 

 Central Synagogue of Hadera (1935) Hadera 
 Kiryat Meir (1937), Tel Aviv
 Histadrut building (1950), Jerusalem

References 

Israeli women architects
German women architects
1904 births
1990 deaths
Gdańsk University of Technology alumni
German emigrants to Mandatory Palestine
20th-century German architects
20th-century Israeli architects
20th-century German women
Emigrants from the Russian Empire to Germany